Mount Markham is a twin-peaked massif surmounting the north end of Antarctica's Markham Plateau. Discovered by the British National Antarctic Expedition of 1901–1904), it is named for Sir Clements Markham, who, as President of the Royal Geographical Society, planned the expedition and chose Robert Falcon Scott as its leader.
Mount Markham is the fourth-highest ultra prominent peak in Antarctica.

See also
 List of Ultras of Antarctica

References

Other sources
 "Mount Markham, Antarctica" on Peakbagger

Mountains of the Ross Dependency
Shackleton Coast
Four-thousanders of Antarctica